is a retired Japanese figure skater. He is the 2016 NHK Trophy bronze medalist, 2019 U.S. Classic champion, 2017 Winter Universiade silver medalist, 2011 World Junior silver medalist, and a two-time Japanese national silver medalist (2016, 2017).

Career 
Tanaka began skating in 2002. He trains in Osaka and Kurashiki under coaches Utako Nagamitsu and Yusuke Hayashi.

2010–2011 season: Silver at Junior Worlds 
Tanaka won the bronze medal at the Junior Grand Prix in Romania and placed sixth in his second JGP event in the U.K.  He finished ninth at the Japan Junior Championships. At the World Junior Championships, he placed sixth in the short program and first in the long program to win the silver medal.

2011–2012 season 
Tanaka won two medals on the JGP series and qualified for his first JGP Final, where he finished sixth. He finished second at the Junior National Championships. He was seventh in his second trip to the World Junior Championships.

2012–2013 season 
Tanaka won silver at one JGP event and finished 4th in another, qualifying for his second JGP Final, where he placed sixth again. After receiving the junior national bronze medal, he was selected to compete at the 2013 World Junior Championships but withdrew due to injury.

2013–2014 season 
Tanaka won two gold medals during the 2013–14 JGP series and qualified for his third JGP Final. He finished fourth after placing first in the short program and fourth in the free skate. He won his first junior national title and was selected to go to the 2014 World Junior Championships, where he once again finished in seventh place.

2014–2015 season 
Tanaka received one Grand Prix assignment, the 2014 Cup of China, where he placed eighth. He finished eighth at the 2014-15 Japanese National Championships and second at the Gardena Spring Trophy later that season.

2016–2017 season: National silver medal 
During the Grand Prix series, Tanaka placed seventh at the 2016 Rostelecom Cup and won the bronze medal at the 2016 NHK Trophy. He received silver at the Japan Championships, in December 2016. In February 2017, he took silver at the Winter Universiade in Almaty, Kazakhstan.

2017–2018 season: Pyeongchang Olympics 
Tanaka finished eighth at the 2017 CS Ondrej Nepela Trophy after placing fourth in the short program and ninth in the free skate. He received two Grand Prix assignments, 2017 Rostelecom Cup and 2017 Cup of China. He withdrew from the first event due to a muscle injury in his right hip-pelvic area. In December, Tanaka won his second National silver medal, and was named to compete at the 2018 Winter Olympics, 2018 Four Continents Championships and the 2018 World Championships.

At the 2018 Four Continents Figure Skating Championships, Tanaka set new personal bests in the short program, free skate and overall, finishing fourth. He placed eighteenth at the 2018 Winter Olympics after placing twentieth in the short and fifteenth in the free.  He ended the season with a thirteenth-place finish at the World Championships.

2018–2019 season 
Again beginning the season at the Ondrej Nepela Trophy, Tanaka won the bronze medal.  He placed eighth at both of his two Grand Prix assignments, the 2018 Grand Prix of Helsinki and the 2018 Internationaux de France.  At the Japanese National Championships, he won the bronze medal behind Shoma Uno and Daisuke Takahashi.  He placed seventh at the 2019 Four Continents Championships, and fourteenth at the 2019 World Championships.

2019–2020 season 
Tanaka began his season at the 2019 U.S. Classic, where he won the gold medal.

Tanaka's first Grand Prix assignment was the 2019 Skate Canada International in Kelowna. Whilst traveling from a training session at the arena, Tanaka and fellow Japanese skater Marin Honda were in a car accident that led to both being briefly hospitalized.  Tanaka was left with a sore knee.  Tanaka was fifth in the short program after tripling a planned quad Salchow and managing only a double toe loop as part of his combination jump.  He skated a new personal best in the free skate, despite two jump errors, and won the bronze medal.  Tanaka was fifth at the Cup of China, his second Grand Prix.

At the 2019–20 Japan Championships, Tanaka placed fourth in both programs to place fourth overall.  He was nevertheless assigned to Japan's team for the 2020 World Championships over bronze medalist Yuma Kagiyama who was assigned to the World Junior and the Four Continents championships. The World Championships were subsequently cancelled as a result of the coronavirus pandemic.

2020–2021 season 
Tanaka was assigned to compete at the 2020 NHK Trophy on the Grand Prix, as part of an all-Japanese men's field in light of the ongoing pandemic limiting international travel.  He was fourth in the short program after multiple jump errors. He was fifth in the free skate, but remained in fourth place overall.  He placed fourth at the 2020–21 Japan Championships.

2021–2022 season 
Beginning the Grand Prix at the 2021 Skate Canada International, Tanaka finished in tenth place. At his second event, the 2021 Rostelecom Cup, he was ninth. 

Tanaka finished in eleventh place at the 2021–22 Japan Championships.

On April 11, he announced his retirement from competitive figure skating, intending to skate in shows and work as an assistant coach.

Programs

Competitive highlights 
GP: Grand Prix; CS: Challenger Series; JGP: Junior Grand Prix

Detailed results

Senior level

Small medals for short and free programs are awarded only at ISU Championships.
At team events, medals are awarded for team results only. T – team result. P – personal/individual result.
Current ISU world bests highlighted in bold and italic. Personal bests are highlighted in bold.

References

External links 

 

1994 births
Japanese male single skaters
Living people
World Junior Figure Skating Championships medalists
People from Kurashiki
Sportspeople from Okayama Prefecture
Universiade medalists in figure skating
Figure skaters at the 2018 Winter Olympics
Olympic figure skaters of Japan
Universiade silver medalists for Japan
Competitors at the 2017 Winter Universiade
Fellows of the American Physical Society